George Cory may refer to:

 George Cory (historian) (1862–1935), English-born South African chemist and historian
 George C. Cory Jr. (1920–1978), American pianist and composer
 George Norton Cory (1874–1968), Canadian-born and educated soldier with the British Army